Derya Can Göçen (born Derya Can on October 12, 1979) is a Turkish world record holder female free-diver and school teacher.

Family life
Derya Can was born in Çanakkale, Turkey on October 12, 1979. She studied physical education and sports at Çanakkale Onsekiz Mart University graduating in 2001. She has been working as a teacher since 2009.

She is married to Tayfun Göçen, who is chief diver of a search and rescue team at the Turkish Coast Guard, and also a free-diver. She is a mother of two children, a 2011-born son Poyraz Mustafa and a daughter Derin Helen born in 2015. The family lives in Canakkale.

Sporting career
She began performing sport already in primary school years. After achieving regional success in athletics, she switched over to taekwondo in the high school. She was called up to the national team camp for the 2000 Summer Olympics after her success as the runners-up at the Turkish championships. However, she had to hang up her boots after sustaining an injury on her knee.

Performing scuba diving since her age of fifteen, she was inspired 
for freediving in 2002 by her cousin, who was a former free-diver. She was admitted to the Turkey national team already in 2003.

Can Göçen holds many titles in diverse freediving disciplines at national, continental and world level competitions. Her achievement was a national record at the same time. On February 25, 2017, she set a new CMAS-approved world record diving a distance of   under the ice layer at the frozen  lake Weissensee in Austria.

She is a member of the Middle East Technical University's underwater sports club ODTÜ SAS. She admits that she is afraid of the deep blue sea, however, continues with free-diving, which helps overcome her fear.

World records
 JB  – 2008
 CWT  – 2013
 CWT  – July 20, 2014 in Kaş, Antalya, Turkey
 VNF  – December 16, 2016 in Kaş
 Distance diving under ice  – Weissensee, Austria

References

Living people
1979 births
Sportspeople from Çanakkale
Çanakkale Onsekiz Mart University alumni
Turkish schoolteachers
Turkish freedivers
Turkish sportswomen
Survivor Turkey contestants